The Aryabhatta Institute Of Engineering & Management Durgapur or AIEM is an undergraduate college in West Bengal, India. It was established in 2003.The college is affiliated with Maulana Abul Kalam Azad University of Technology and all the programmes are approved by the All India Council for Technical Education.

The campus is located at Panagarh, Bardhaman.

Academics
The institute offers seven B.Tech. courses:-

B.Tech in Electronics and Communication Engineering (ECE)- 4 years [Approved intake - 120]
B.Tech in Electronics and Electrical Engineering (ECE)- 4 years [Approved intake - 30]
B.Tech in Electrical Engineering (EE)- 4 years [Approved intake - 90]
B.Tech in Mechanical Engineering (ME)- 4 years [Approved intake - 60]
B.Tech in Computer Science and Engineering (CSE)- 4 years [Approved intake - 60]
B.Tech in Civil Engineering (CE)- 4 years [Approved intake - 60]
B.Tech in Information Technology (IT)- 4 years [Approved intake - 60]

It also offers:-

 Master of Business Administration- 2 years [Approved intake - 60]
 Bachelor of Computer Application- 3 years [Approved intake - 60]
 Bachelor of Hospitality Management- 3 years [Approved intake - 30]
 Bachelor of Business Administration [Approved intake - 60]

See also

References

External links
 
University Grants Commission
National Assessment and Accreditation Council

Colleges affiliated to West Bengal University of Technology
Private engineering colleges in India
Engineering colleges in West Bengal
Universities and colleges in Paschim Bardhaman district
Education in Durgapur, West Bengal
Educational institutions established in 2003
2003 establishments in West Bengal